Mara Candelaria Reardon is an American politician who is a member of the Indiana House of Representatives, representing the 12th District from 2007 - 2015, and then 2017 to present. Candelaria Reardon is a member of the Democratic Party. She was first elected in 2006. She was defeated in the 2014 general election by Republican Bill Fine, but defeated him in the 2016 general election.

Candelaria Reardon was a candidate for the Democratic nomination for Indiana's 1st congressional district, to replace retiring incumbent Pete Visclosky. She announced her run on November 21, 2019. Frank J. Mrvan of Lake County won the nomination and the seat in Congress.

Biography
Candelaria Reardon was born in East Chicago, Indiana, in 1964. She is the daughter of Isabelino "Cande" Candelaria, the first Puerto Rican appointed to a city council in Indiana, and Victoria Soto Candelaria, the first Latina elected as President of the Indiana Federation of Teachers. She graduated from Munster High School in Munster, Indiana, in 1982. She attended Indiana University Northwest for her undergraduate degree, and gained her Juris Doctor degree at John Marshall School of Law in Chicago.

Political career

She is the Chair of the Board of Hispanic Caucus Chairs (BHCC), serves as Chair of the National Association of Elected and Appointed Officials (NALEO) Education Fund Board of Directors, and is a member of the National Hispanic Caucus of State Legislators (NHCSL).

Reardon has advocated for greater funding for drug addiction treatment and legalizing medical marijuana.

She has generally opposed cuts to public education funding, limits on collective bargaining, cuts to unemployment insurance programs, repealing Common Core education standards, and directing state funding to private charter schools.

In July 2018, Reardon was one of five women who alleged they were sexually harassed by Indiana Attorney General Curtis Hill, a Republican, while celebrating the end of the General Assembly session at AJ's Lounge, an adult party bar and the oldest African-American-owned bar in Indianapolis. He denied the allegations. Reardon and three other women filed a civil lawsuit against Hill. On March 2, 2020, the lawsuit and all federal claims in the civil case brought against the Attorney General by Candelaria and three other women were dismissed by federal Judge Jane Magnus-Stinson of the U.S. District Court of Southern Indiana. They refiled their suit in State Court.

There were 14 candidates, including Frank J. Mrvan, supported by Visclosky as his chosen successor. Mrvan won both the Democratic nomination and the general election.

Election results

2012

2014

2016

2018

References

External links
Indiana State Legislature - Representative Mara Candelaria Reardon Official government website
Project Vote Smart - Representative Mara Candelaria Reardon (IN) profile
Follow the Money - Mara Candelaria Reardon
candidate profile campaign contributions
Lake County, Indiana 2014 General Election Results

Democratic Party members of the Indiana House of Representatives
Living people
Women state legislators in Indiana
People from East Chicago, Indiana
People from Munster, Indiana
Indiana University alumni
American politicians of Puerto Rican descent
Hispanic and Latino American women in politics
Year of birth missing (living people)
Hispanic and Latino American state legislators
21st-century American politicians
21st-century American women politicians